Marie-Évangeline-Prudence Jouan, known as Éva Jouan (1857-1910) was a French poet.

Life
Éva Jouan was born at Le Palais in Belle-Île-en-Mer on April 17, 1857. She died there on February 10, 1910.

Works
 (with Gabrielle Gomien) Téméraires ambitions. Limoges: E. Ardant, 1901.
 Au bord de l'Océan. Limoges: E. Ardant, 1902.
 La Meilleure Part. Limoges: E. Ardant, 1903.
 Trois mois à Belle-Isle-en-Mer : journal d'une jeune fille. Paris, 1910
 L'abandonnée. Paris: Bonne presse, 1911.

References

1857 births
1910 deaths
19th-century French poets
20th-century French poets
French women poets
20th-century French women